The Oscar Peterson Trio in Tokyo is a live album by jazz pianist Oscar Peterson and his trio, released in 1972 (see 1972 in music). It was reissued in 2005 by Columbia Japan with a revised track sequence as Last Trio: Oscar Peterson in Tokyo.

Track listing
 "The Good Life" (Jean Broussole, Sacha Distel, Jack Reardon) – 5:32
 "What Am I Here For" (Duke Ellington) – 5:46
 "I Hear Music" (Burton Lane, Frank Loesser) – 6:36
 "What Are You Doing the Rest of Your Life?" (Alan Bergman, Marilyn Bergman, Michel Legrand) – 4:53
 "Strike Up the Band" (George Gershwin, Ira Gershwin) – 4:33
 "The More I See You" (Mack Gordon, Harry Warren) – 5:36
 "Wheatland" (Oscar Peterson) – 6:46
 "The Preacher" (Horace Silver) – 4:26
 "Old Rockin' Chair" (Hoagy Carmichael) – 4:20
 "Blues Etude" (Peterson) – 7:03

Personnel
 Oscar Peterson – piano
 Michel Donato – double bass
 Louis Hayes – drums

References

External links
Jazz Discographies

Oscar Peterson live albums
1972 live albums
Denon Records live albums